A Different Time is a solo piano album by John Medeski, featuring performances on a 1924 French Gaveau piano, which was released on the OKeh label in 2013.

Reception

Critics greeted the album with mixed receptions. In his review for Allmusic, Thom Jurek notes that:

The PopMatters review by Will Layman stated:

Jeff Tamarkin of JazzTimes observed:

On All About Jazz Doug Collette enthused:

On the same site Dan Bilawsky noted:

Track listing
All compositions by John Medeski except as indicated
 "A Different Time" - 4:33  
 "I'm Falling in Love Again" (Willie Nelson) - 5:44  
 "His Eye Is on the Sparrow" (Charles H. Gabriel, Civilla D. Martin) - 6:18  
 "Ran" - 1:54  
 "Graveyard Fields" - 6:07  
 "Luz Marina" - 5:35  
 "Waiting at the Gate" - 2:30  
 "Lacrima" - 3:55  
 "Otis" - 4:58

Personnel
John Medeski - piano

References

Sources

John Medeski albums
Okeh Records albums
2013 albums